The Chennai–New Jalpaiguri SuperFast Express is a superfast express of Southern Railway connecting Indian cities Chennai the capital of Tamil Nadu and Siliguri the largest metropolis of North Bengal. This is the first direct train service originating from MGR Chennai Central and terminating at New Jalpaiguri (Siliguri).  The train connects Eastern and Southern part of India covering the states of West Bengal, Bihar, Orissa, Andhra Pradesh & Tamil Nadu. It also passes through Sahibganj district & Pakur district of Jharkhand but does not have any stoppages there.

Though this a weekly train it is a very popular train in this route. As the demand for tickets is very high, one has to book a ticket many days in advance before the journey date to get a confirmed berth.

Accommodations
This train comprises 2 AC 2-Tiers, 4 AC 3-Tiers, 13 Sleeper Class, 2 Unreserved General Compartment & 2 Luggage/Parcel.Total coach composition is 23.

Major halts
On its way from MGR Chennai Central to New Jalpaiguri (Siliguri) , the 22611 travels across many important stations. They are as follows:

TAMIL NADU (01 Stop)
MGR Chennai Central (Starts)

ANDHRA PRADESH (08 Stops)
Nellore
Ongole
Vijayawada
Eluru
Anakapalle
Duvvada
Visakhapatnam
Vizianagaram

ODISHA (04 Stops)
Brahmapur
Khurda
Bhubaneswar
Cuttack

BIHAR (02 Stops)
Barsoi
Kishanganj

WEST BENGAL (09 Stops)
Hijli
Bankura
Adra
Asansol
Durgapur
Rampurhat
Malda Town
 
  New Jalpaiguri Junction (Siliguri) (Ends).

Note: Bold letters indicates Major Railway Stations/Major Cities.

Reversal
Chennai-NJP(Siliguri) Superfast Express reverses the direction in the following stations:

See also
Chennai Central railway station
Tambaram-Silghat Town Nagaon Express
Bangalore-Guwahati Express
Thiruvananthapuram–Silchar Superfast Express
New Tinsukia-Bengaluru Express
Bangalore-Agartala Humsafar Express
Dibrugarh–Kanyakumari Vivek Express
Yesvantpur–Kamakhya AC Superfast Express
New Jalpaiguri Junction railway station
New Jalpaiguri–New Delhi Superfast Express
New Jalpaiguri–Howrah Shatabdi Express
New Jalpaiguri-Udaipur Superfast Express

References

External links
    Railway website

Transport in Chennai
Transport in Jalpaiguri
Express trains in India
Rail transport in West Bengal
Transport in Siliguri
Rail transport in Bihar
Rail transport in Odisha
Rail transport in Andhra Pradesh
Rail transport in Tamil Nadu
Railway services introduced in 2011